Matjiesrivier is a town at the southern foot of the Waboomsberg, some 37 km south of Prince Albert, off the road to Oudtshoorn. Afrikaans for 'mat river', the reference is to a type of sedge (Cyperus textilis) growing there, used by Khoekhoen in making mats with which they made their huts. Matjiesgoed is the common name for this sedge, literally 'mat stuff.

References

Populated places in the Oudtshoorn Local Municipality